Edward L. Warner (July 5, 1929 – September 7, 2002) was an American college basketball player.  He was one of the stars of the 1949–50 CCNY Beavers men's basketball team, the only team to win both the NCAA tournament and the National Invitation Tournament (NIT) in the same year.  He was also a central figure in the point shaving scandal that came to light in the aftermath of that season.

College career
Warner came from DeWitt Clinton High School in the Bronx to play college basketball for Nat Holman at the City College of New York.  A 6'3" forward, he regularly battled with bigger men to average 14.8 points per game as a sophomore for the Beavers during their championship year. In the 1950 NIT, he upped this average to 21.7 per game and was named the tournament's Most Valuable Player as CCNY defeated Bradley in the final at Madison Square Garden.  A couple of weeks later, the Beavers again beat Bradley, this time in the 1950 NCAA tournament, to become the only team to win both tournaments in the same year.

Point shaving scandal

The next season, Warner and teammate Ed Roman were named co-captains for the Beavers and were poised to defend their championship titles. On February 18, 1951, New York City District Attorney Frank Hogan arrested seven men for point shaving, including Warner. While most convicted players received suspended sentences, he was sent to prison for six months. A lawyer in the case remarked:

"(Judge Saul) Streit considered Warner to be incorrigible and uncontrollable.  Warner was too flamboyant and he also had a record as a juvenile delinquent.  Streit believed in rehabilitation by deprivation"

For his involvement in fixing games, Warner was permanently banned from playing in the National Basketball Association.

EBA, prison, high school, paralysis and death
After serving his sentence at Rikers Island prison, Warner played several years in the Eastern Basketball Association. In the 1960s, he was again imprisoned, for attempting to sell heroin. He then officiated high school basketball games until he was partly paralyzed in a 1984 car accident. He died on September 7, 2002.

References

1929 births
2002 deaths
American men's basketball players
Banned National Basketball Association players
CCNY Beavers men's basketball players
DeWitt Clinton High School alumni
People from Harlem
Basketball players from New York City
Power forwards (basketball)
Sportspeople involved in betting scandals